Boo Seeka is the solo project of Australian electropop singer-songwriter, Ben "Boo" Gumbleton.  Boo Seeka have released one studio album to date.

History

2015-2018: Beginnings and Never Too Soon
Boo Seeka's debut single "Kingdom Leader" was released in January 2015.

In 2015, Boo Seeka covered MØ's "Pilgrim", which was included on Like a Version compilation. Boo Seeka was nominated for Unearthed Artist of the Year at the J Awards in 2015.
In January 2016, his single "Deception Bay" was ranked at number 50 on the Triple J Hottest 100, 2015.

The band list Massive Attack, Mayer Hawthorne and Cody Chesnutt as influences.

On 4 August 2017, Boo Seeka released their debut album, Never Too Soon, which peaked at number 8 on the ARIA Charts.

2020-present: Between The Head & The Heart
In May 2020, upon the release of "Take a Look", Gumbleton confirmed an upcoming second album.

On 22 June 2021, Gumbleton said that he and May had parted ways due to "fundamental differences" and Boo Seeka would now be a solo project. 

Boo Seeka's second album, Between The Head & The Heart was released on 30 June 2022.

Members

Current members
 Ben Gumbleton (2015-present)

Previous members
 Sam Croft (2015-2018) 
 Michael May (2019-2021)

Discography

Studio albums

Singles

As lead artist

As featured artist

Other appearances

Awards and nominations

J Award
The J Awards are an annual series of Australian music awards that were established by the Australian Broadcasting Corporation's youth-focused radio station Triple J. They commenced in 2005.

|-
| J Awards of 2015
|themselves
| Unearthed Artist of the Year
|

References

External links
 

Australian indie pop groups
New South Wales musical groups
Musicians from Sydney
Australian electronic musicians
Musical groups established in 2015
2015 establishments in Australia